Gustavo dos Santos (born 21 February 1991) is a Brazilian sprinter. He competed in the 4 × 100 metres relay event at the 2015 World Championships in Athletics in Beijing, China.

References

External links

1991 births
Living people
Brazilian male sprinters
World Athletics Championships athletes for Brazil
Place of birth missing (living people)
Pan American Games silver medalists for Brazil
Pan American Games medalists in athletics (track and field)
South American Games bronze medalists for Brazil
South American Games medalists in athletics
Athletes (track and field) at the 2015 Pan American Games
Competitors at the 2010 South American Games
Medalists at the 2015 Pan American Games
21st-century Brazilian people